The PBA Season 47 draft was the 37th edition of the PBA draft. It was an event that allowed teams to take turns selecting amateur basketball players and other eligible players, including half-Filipino foreign players. The league determined the drafting order based on the performance of the member teams from the 2021 season, with the worst team picking first.

Draft order
In past drafts until 2019, the draft order was determined based on the overall performance of the teams from the previous season. The Philippine Cup final ranking comprised 40% of the points, while the rankings of the Commissioner's and Governors' Cups were 30% each.

Since the league only held two tournaments for the  2021 season, only the final rankings of the Philippine Cup (60%) and Governors' Cup (40%) were used to determine the draft order.

 Converge's previous franchisee competed as the Alaska Aces during the 2021 season.

Draft selections

1st round

2nd round

3rd round

4th round

Converge, Rain or Shine, NLEX, and Barangay Ginebra passed during the round.

5th round

Meralco, TNT, and Magnolia passed during the round.

6th round

Blackwater and NorthPort passed during the round.

7th round
A seventh round was held, but all remaining teams passed, thus ending the draft.

Trades involving draft picks

Pre-draft trades
Note: The rights to Alaska's draft picks were retained by Converge.
Prior to the day of the draft, the following trades were made and resulted in exchanges of picks between the teams.

References

External links
 PBA.ph

2022
2022 in Philippine basketball
May 2022 sports events in the Philippines